Liz Linehan is an American politician serving as a member of the Connecticut House of Representatives from the 103rd district. She assumed office in 2017.

Early life and education 
Linehan was born and raised in Cheshire, Connecticut. She earned a Bachelor of Arts degree in communications from Central Connecticut State University.

Career 
Prior to entering politics, Linehan worked as a radio show producer and small business owner. Linehan also served as a member of the Cheshire Town Council. She was elected to the Connecticut House of Representatives in 2016 and assumed office in 2017. During the 2017 legislative session, Linehan served as vice chair of the House Veterans' Affairs. Since 2019, he has served as co-chair of the House Children Committee.

References 

Living people
People from Cheshire, Connecticut
Central Connecticut State University alumni
Democratic Party members of the Connecticut House of Representatives
Women state legislators in Connecticut
Year of birth missing (living people)
21st-century American women